in Tokyo, a Japan's traditional boxing club whose genesis dates back to 1926, manages professional boxers as a member of the , a subsidiary body of . In order to distinguish from three related clubs i.e. Osaka Teiken Boxing Gym, Fukuoka Teiken Boxing Gym and Hachinohe Teiken Boxing Gym, it is often referred to as "Teiken (Boxing) Gym in Tokyo" or "Tokyo's Teiken (Boxing) Gym".

Teiken Promotions Inc. in Sakae-chō, Kita, Tokyo, also headed by the boxing promoter Akihiko Honda, is the managerial and promotional company for the Teiken Boxing Gyms and other worldwide professional boxers, as well as supervising the boxers' training. While Teiken Promotions has so far directed world champions such as Jirō Watanabe who belonged to Osaka Teiken Boxing Gym, Genaro Hernández, David Griman, José Luis Bueno, Eloy Rojas, César Bazán, Alexander Muñoz, Edwin Valero, Román González et al., Teiken Boxing Gym has brought up similarly the world champions Masao Ōba, Tsuyoshi Hamada, Jorge Linares, Toshiaki Nishioka, Takahiro Aō, Akifumi Shimoda, Shinsuke Yamanaka, Toshiyuki Igarashi, Takashi Miura et al.

Besides, Teiken Promotions has provided boxing television programs on Nippon Television (under the auspices of the Hochi Shimbun), Nittele G+ and WOWOW. This article primarily focuses on Teiken Boxing Gym in Tokyo, while featuring the major activities of Teiken Promotions.

History

Early 20th century 
When  who learned boxing in San Francisco, California, United States since 1906 to bring it to Japan established  as the first genuine boxing gym in Shimomeguro, Meguro, Tokyo on December 25, 1921,  whose father lived in the United States and who aimed at becoming a trading merchant while studying at Rikkyo University, started boxing there under Watanabe's management. Ogino, a right-handed boxer known by his quick spear-like cross, was recognized as the Japanese junior featherweight champion by Nippon Kentō Club in 1922. That was one of the first boxing titles in Japan authorized at two weight divisions. His professional record was 8–2 (1 KO) with 9 draws, 2 exhibition matches, and one more match whose result is unknown. Since the gym collapsed in the Great Kantō earthquake, Ogino went on a visit to Shanghai, China with three boxers in spite of Watanabe's objection, in 1924. That first overseas expedition for Japanese boxers became an opportunity for the birth of Teiken Boxing Gym. Ogino also appeared in the Japan's first boxing movie  in 1926.

Evaluated as a good referee as well, Ogino also did the writing work.  from Waseda University who became the president of the Korakuen Stadium later, and was also appointed as the first commissioner of the Japan Boxing Commission in April 1952, assumed the position of its founding president.

After  for the establishment of championships and the development of professional boxers was formed in February 1931, as Teiken Boxing Gym, one of its members, declared their secession in April 1932, the association was divided into two factions.

Mid-20th century 

The 1960s when the distinctive Japanese and OPBF champions  such as Kazuo Takayama, Teruo Kosaka, Kenji Fukuchi, Makoto Watanabe and Morio Kaneda won popularity has been termed as the "Golden Age" of Teiken Boxing Gym, as well as Japan's boxing of the same time having been called so. Kazuo Takayama's first world title shot against Davey Moore attracted 20,000 spectators at the Korakuen Stadium in August 1960. Teruo Kosaka's third world title shot against Gabriel Elorde which was his last match was watched by the audience of 33,000 at the Araneta Coliseum in Quezon City, Philippines in June 1965. Today Yūjirō Watanabe, Sadayuki Ogino and Akira Honda are respectively referred to as "Father of Japanese Boxing", "Mother of Japanese Boxing" and "Emperor of Japanese Boxing".

Late 20th century 
When Akira Honda died as the president of Teiken Boxing Gym in Tokyo in 1964, his son Akihiko Honda took possession of that post at the age of seventeen with the help of Haru Nagano. In 1970 when Honda was a Rikkyo University's student at the age of twenty-two, Masao Ōba managed by him gained the first world title for Teiken Boxing Gym in the flyweight division. He is the current president of Teiken Boxing Gym in Tokyo as well as Teiken Promotions.

Teiken Boxing Gym has continued a clear contractual relationship, the development of the boxers which does not give them a title shot in a hurry, and the steady promotion corresponding to each boxer's ability. They have given their boxers high rewards. As one example, Tsuyoshi Hamada's match fee for his second defense in July 1987 was 299,600 dollars in the amount of time.

Honda promoted two of Mike Tyson's fights for the world heavyweight title both at the Tokyo Dome. The number of spectators of the fight against Buster Douglas in 1990 was 51,600, while its audience rating was 38.3 percent. Jimmy Lennon Jr. handled the ring announcements. As for the fight against Tony Tubbs in 1988, the attendance was 51,000 and the rating was 28.8 percent. Those two fights hold the top two attendance records in Japan's boxing history. Realizing a first world title tripleheader in Japan in 1998, Honda continuously carried it out seven times until April 2013.

2000s 

In March 2007 Teiken Boxing Gym in Tokyo announced Tsuyoshi Hamada would take office as the representative of Teiken Promotions, while Honda would promote their boxers in the international market as the president. Shortly thereafter, Naoki Matsuda who was then uncrowned scored an epoch-making victory by knocking out Rodolfo López in Cancún, Quintana Roo, Mexico.

When Takahiro Aō won the world title on March 12, 2009, Teiken Boxing Gym in Tokyo had simultaneously three active world champions. From that time, journalists of sports papers and others came to write it again as the "Golden Age" of Teiken Boxing Gym. However the fatal accident later mentioned in the section entitled #Two fatalities occurred during a Japanese title match just nine days after that, and Teiken Boxing Gym in Tokyo became comparatively estranged from worldly things.

At that time, the leading trainers in Teiken Boxing Gym in Tokyo were Sendai Tanaka and Yūichi Kasai. Tanaka who studied with the International Boxing Hall of Famer Amílcar Brusa is proficient in the Spanish language and had ever served as Marco Antonio Barrera's trainer. He guided Edwin Valero, Jorge Linares, Román González and Takahiro Aō to the world titles, while coaching the world title challengers Motoki Sasaki and Kōji Satō, the then Japanese champions Daisuke Nakagawa and Yoshihiro Kamegai, and the future world champion Carlos Cuadras et al. He also helped Yūichi Kasai. Kasai led Toshiaki Nishioka, Akifumi Shimoda, Toshiyuki Igarashi and Takashi Miura to their world titles, while training the former mixed martial artist Hiromitsu Miura et al. In addition, there are Shin Yamato, Yūji Nakano and several other trainers coaching boxers including the world champion Shinsuke Yamanaka, the future International champion Yasutaka Ishimoto and the current/former OPBF/Japanese champions. Since autumn 2009, Masahiko Nakamura has served as the strength and conditioning coach for the gym. He is responsible for trunk strengthening to balance their bodies.

The world title doubleheader on October 10, 2009 was also broadcast live on Azteca in Mexico, in addition to Japan and Venezuela.

2010s 
The world title doubleheader on April 30, 2010 was broadcast live in three countries, and that on October 24 of the same year was carried live on Japan's NTV and the United Kingdom's Sky Sports, and relayed also in Mexico, Venezuela and Nicaragua.

Although Takahiro Aō and Jorge Linares lost their world titles in the latter half of 2009, when Akifumi Shimoda became the sixth world champion for Teiken Boxing Gym in Tokyo in January 2011, there came to be three active world champions at the same time in the gym again.

One month before the sixth world title tripleheader for Teiken Promotions in April 2011, Honda unofficially announced two plans in the mid-2011 for Akifumi Shimoda and Toshiaki Nishioka to fight in the United States. Soon after that, Tōhoku earthquake occurred. Confirming the intentions of all participating boxers in that tripleheader, Honda considered their safety at the top priority. Then, preparing for the blackout, he made effort to secure by themselves the necessary minimum electric power for the live telecast and for operating the venue facilities, in consultation with Nippon Television which would broadcast the fights. However, he decided to refund all previous tickets and change the venue from the Ryōgoku Kokugikan in Tokyo to the World Memorial Hall in Kobe, Hyōgo for the risk management. That tripleheader event was relayed in the United States, Argentina, Italy and other countries, in addition to Japan's NTV and Mexico's Televisa.

After that, Honda stated that it would be difficult for a while to hold events in Japan, due to power problems in the metropolitan area caused by the earthquake. In May of that year, Teiken Boxing Gym in Tokyo officially announced three matches from May through July in Mexico and the United States including Akifumi Shimoda's mandatory defense against Rico Ramos as the HBO televised co-main event to Paul Williams vs. Erislandy Lara at the Boardwalk Hall in Atlantic City, New Jersey, staged by Goossen Tutor Promotions in association with Golden Boy Promotions and Teiken Promotions. In July of the same year, they released a world title doubleheader featuring Toshiaki Nishioka and Román González at the MGM Grand Hotel and Casino in October, presented by Teiken Promotions in association with Top Rank and Zanfer Promotions. Since around that year, the gym has been more aggressively seeking opportunities for their boxers to fight outside Japan, while exploring new venues inside of the country. As of July 2012, they had had four reigning world champions. From the beginning of 2013, most of the leading boxers are often coached by Ismael Salas and Miguel Diaz in Las Vegas, Nevada.

Two fatalities 
On March 21, 2009, the minimumweight boxer of Teiken Boxing Gym in Tokyo, and Hosei University alumni Masatate Tsuji (born in 1978) lost his first title shot via a final round knockout in a ten-round bout in the thirtieth edition of the annual Japanese boxing series, the Champion Carnival at the Korakuen Hall. In October 2008, Tsuji who made a professional debut on October 19, 2002 had won the other annual series Japanese title elimination tournament nicknamed  with the winner becoming the next mandatory challenger against the Japanese titleholder at the Champion Carnival, after defeating Akira Yaegashi in its semi-final match. In the scores until the ninth round of his fight in March 2009, all three judges gave a five to six point advantage for Tsuji. However fizzled from around three quarters, he lost consciousness just after the fight. Although Tsuji was taken to the hospital directly from the ring of the Korakuen Hall by the ambulance to undergo craniotomy immediately due to the acute subdural hematoma, he died without regaining consciousness on March 24, 2009. His final records were 31–19 (10 KOs) in amateur bouts, and 12–2 (3 KOs) with 2 draws in professional bouts. Tsuji now rests in peace on the Seto Inland Sea coast in his home city Hiroshima. Prior to that, the former Japanese lightweight champion Nobuo Kobayashi (born in 1910) of Teiken Boxing Gym has become the first boxing fatality in Japan at the Koshien tennis court in Nishinomiya, Hyōgo on September 1, 1930. Therefore, that was the second death for Teiken Boxing Gym as a result of injuries suffered in the ring.

After Tsuji's fatality, Teiken Boxing Gym in Tokyo refrained from activities such as the advertisement and the recruitment of trainees, and closed their homepage. Besides, all six promising young boxers of Teiken Boxing Gym who had been slated to compete in the East Japan Rookie King Tournament in 2010, declined to participate in it. Such circumstances caused the criticism or the guess and even the rumor that Teiken Boxing Gym in Tokyo might close.

As Tsuyoshi Hamada told later, several boxers had fought wearing boxing shorts with Tsuji's name on them. Yoshihiro Kamegai and Shinsuke Yamanaka who both fought on the undercard of Tsuji's final match earned their first Japanese title shots wearing such shorts in the first half of 2010. Past the second death anniversary of Tsuji, Teiken Boxing Gym in Tokyo resumed the official website after the prior notice.

World champions 
Following above mentioned Masao Ōba (1970), Tsuyoshi Hamada won the world title in the junior welterweight division in 1986. While there were several multiple-time world title challengers such as Kazuo Takayama (1960, 1961), Teruo Kosaka (1962, 1964, 1965), Shūichi Hozumi (1983, 1986), Fujio Ozaki (1988, 1989), Shirō Yahiro (1993, 1996, 1998) and Yūichi Kasai (1994, 1996, 1997), no one got a world championship belt in Teiken Boxing Gym in Tokyo for about twenty-one years, although the boxers promoted by Honda such as Genaro Hernández (1991, 1997), David Griman (1992), José Luis Bueno (1993), Eloy Rojas (1993), César Bazán (1998), Alexander Muñoz (2002, 2007), Edwin Valero (2006, 2009), and Román González (2008, 2011) were crowned the world champions. On the other hand, in Osaka Teiken Boxing Gym, Jirō Watanabe (1982, 1984), Takuya Muguruma (1987) and Jōichirō Tatsuyoshi (1991, 1993, 1997) captured it from 1980s to 1990s. In those days, Teiken Boxing Gym in Tokyo's trainer Isamu Kuwata and Osaka Teiken Boxing Gym's trainer Jun'ichi Okubo were presented with the Eddie Townsend Award in 1992 and 1993, respectively.

Meantime, the boxers continued training under the supervision of Honda, and under the instruction of trainers including Yūichi Kasai who retired as a boxer in 1997 and Sendai Tanaka who signed a deal with Teiken Boxing Gym in Tokyo in May 2003. They have a very strong solidarity as a team where each individual loves the gym. Once Jorge Linares (2007, twice in 2008) earned his first world title shot in the featherweight division in Las Vegas, Nevada, Toshiaki Nishioka (2008), Takahiro Aō (2009, 2010), Akifumi Shimoda (2011), Shinsuke Yamanaka (2011), Toshiyuki Igarashi (2012) and Takashi Miura (2013) successively secured it.

Notes

References

Bibliography

External links 
 

Boxing clubs in Japan
Sports clubs established in 1926
Mass media companies based in Tokyo
Mass media companies established in 1926
1926 establishments in Japan